Marinette may refer to:

Places
 Marinette, Arizona, a ghost town in Maricopa County, U.S.
 Marinette, Nova Scotia, a community of the Halifax Regional Municipality in Canada
 Marinette, Wisconsin, a city in Wisconsin bordering Michigan, U.S.
 Marinette County, Wisconsin, the county in the northeast corner of Wisconsin, U.S.

Other uses

 Marinette (Vodou), a cruel and vicious loa (spirit) in Haitian Vodou
 Marinette Dupain-Cheng, a character in the French animated series Miraculous: Tales of Ladybug & Cat Noir
 Marinette Pichon (born in 1975), a French football player
 Marinette Yacht (1954–1991), a line of motor yachts built by Aluminum Cruisers Inc.
 USS Marinette (YTB-791), a 1967 United States Navy harbor tug

See also
 La Marinete, one of the IAI Dagger squadrons in the Argentine air forces in the Falklands War
 Marionette (disambiguation)